"All God's Children" is a song recorded by American singer Belinda Carlisle for her second greatest hits album, A Place on Earth: The Greatest Hits. It was written by Paul Barry, Billy Lawrie and Mark Taylor. It was released as a single in November 1999, reaching #66 on the UK Singles Chart.

Music video
A music video was created for the song, directed by Lee Donaldson.

Track listing
 "All God's Children"
 "Runaway Horses"
 "Only a Dream"

Charts

References

1999 singles
Belinda Carlisle songs
Songs written by Mark Taylor (record producer)
Songs written by Paul Barry (songwriter)
Song recordings produced by Mark Taylor (record producer)
Virgin Records singles
Songs written by Billy Lawrie
1999 songs